José Francisco Borges or  J. Borges (born 1935 in Bezerros, Pernambuco) is a Brazilian folk poet and woodcut artist. He is a proponent of Cordel literature.

External links
Tesoros Trading Company reprint of New York Times article about Jose Borges
http://www.mariposa-arts.net/GalleryMain.asp?GalleryID=136733&AKey=tjms9e5s
Roots: J. Borges
The Troubadours of Brazil's Backlands
Prestes a completar 80 anos, J. Borges abre as portas do ateliê em Bezerros para fazer balanço sobre vida e obra, with video interview

20th-century Brazilian male writers
21st-century Brazilian male writers
20th-century Brazilian poets
21st-century Brazilian poets
Brazilian male poets
Brazilian printmakers
People from Pernambuco
1935 births
Living people